The 1982 season was the 13th season of national competitive association football in Australia and 99th overall.

National teams

Australia national soccer team

Results and fixtures

Friendlies

Men's football

National Soccer League

Cup competitions

NSL Cup

Final

References

External links
 Football Australia official website

1982 in Australian soccer
Seasons in Australian soccer